Albanian Supercup 2000 is the seventh edition of the Albanian Supercup since its establishment in 1989. The match was contested between the Albanian Cup 2000 winners KS Teuta and the 1999–2000 Albanian Superliga champions KF Tirana.

Match details

See also
 1999–2000 Albanian Superliga
 1999–2000 Albanian Cup

References

RSSSF.com

2000
Supercup
Albanian Supercup, 2000
Albanian Supercup, 2000